Francesco Pau (born * February 1954) is an Italian actor. He is best known for his role as Giton in Satyricon (1969).

Filmography
Satyricon (1969)
I ragazzi della Roma violenta (1976)
A Sold Life (1976)
Cugine mie (1978)

External links

1954 births
20th-century Italian male actors
Italian male film actors
Living people